Laurence Lebeau (married name is Monclar) (born 4 June 1957 at Longeville-lès-Metz) is a former French athlete, who specialized in the 100 meters hurdles.

Biography  
In 1975, Laurence Lebeau became the first French junior champion of Europe in any sport, by winning 100 hurdles during the European Junior Championships, at Athens.

She won three titles of champion of France: two in the 100 meters hurdles in 1978 and 1980, and one Indoors in the 60m hurdles in 1980. She twice improved the French record of the 100 meters hurdles, bringing it to 13.20s then to 13.03s in 1980.  She also held the record for the France 50 m hurdles(Indoors) running 6.98s (1981).

She participated in the 1980 Olympics, at Moscow, and reached the semifinals of the 100m hurdles.

Private life  
She is the wife of Jacques Monclar,  basketball player and coach with whom she had three children, Julian and Benjamin, also basketball players.

Prize list  
 French Outdoor Championships in Athletics   :  
 winner 100m hurdles 1978 and 1980.   
 French Indoors Championships in Athletics:  
 winner of the 60m hurdles in 1980.

Records

Notes and references

External links  
 Olympic profile for Laurence Lebeau at sports-reference.com

1957 births
Living people
French female hurdlers
Olympic athletes of France
Athletes (track and field) at the 1980 Summer Olympics
Sportspeople from Moselle (department)